The Magic Whip (stylised in Chinese text) is the eighth studio album by English rock band Blur. It was recorded in Hong Kong and London, and released by Parlophone on 27 April 2015 and Warner Bros. Records on 28 April 2015. It was the band's first studio album in 12 years since Think Tank (2003), marking the longest gap between studio albums in Blur's career, and the first in 16 years since 13 (1999) to have featured the original line-up (Coxon featuring on only one song on Think Tank). The album also marks the return of the band's longtime producer Stephen Street following Blur (1997).

The album received acclaim from music critics. It debuted at number one on the UK Albums Chart, marking Blur's sixth UK number-one album. It has been certified Gold by the British Phonographic Industry (BPI) for sales of over 100,000 copies. It is the first album by the band in North America under Warner Bros., after Blur were transferred from Virgin Records in 2013, following the purchase of EMI and its assets by the Universal Music Group in 2012.

Background
In May 2013, Blur were set to play Japan's Tokyo Rocks Music festival. However, the entire festival was canceled for unknown reasons, leaving the band stranded in Hong Kong for an extra five days. In an attempt to distract themselves, they worked on new material in Avon Studios, as announced by lead singer Damon Albarn during the gig at AsiaWorld–Expo, Chek Lap Kok. Albarn later stated he was unsure whether the resulting music would ever be released. In July 2014, he commented, "There are about 15 songs...the annoying thing is, if I'd been able to write the lyrics there and then about being there, we'd have finished the record. But sometimes, if you can't do it all at once, it dissipates really and I don't know what I'd sing about now with that record. There's some great tunes on there, but it may just be one of those records that never comes out."

In November 2014, Graham Coxon started to work further on the recordings with producer Stephen Street, while Albarn was touring his solo album, Everyday Robots (2014). Coxon commented "I kept thinking about the recordings we had made in Hong Kong and remembering how good it felt. I wouldn't have forgiven myself if I hadn't had another look". Coxon would secretly invite Alex James and Dave Rowntree to further recording sessions to build upon the material. Once nearing completion, Coxon presented the music to Albarn to see if it was worthy of an album. On the way back from his tour of Australia in December, Albarn stopped in Hong Kong once more for lyrical inspiration. Vocals were completed towards the end of January 2015 and the album's mastering was finished on 18 February 2015, the day before the album was announced to the press in London's Chinatown.

Artwork and title
The album cover artwork has the words blur and  magic whip written in Chinese surrounding an ice cream cone, all rendered in neon-lit fashion. Art director Tony Hung, who created the lyric video for "Go Out", the first track to be released from the album, met with frontman Damon Albarn in early 2015 to discuss the album artwork and was shown photos and ephemera from the singer's travels in Hong Kong. "The album title, The Magic Whip [Albarn] explained, was multifaceted," says Hung. "An ice cream in the UK, a firework in China and a 'whip' in a political sense. These extremes would reflect the different textures, breadth, and depth of the album." Hung says that the band wanted a cover that touched on those themes and that also had a "rawer feel" to give a sense of how the record came together in Hong Kong (the band recorded quickly, in a small studio in the city).

Promotion
The video for "Go Out" was uploaded to YouTube on 19 February 2015. Videos for "There Are Too Many of Us", "Lonesome Street", "Ong Ong", and "I Broadcast" followed on 20 March, 2 April, 3 June, and 8 September 2015, respectively. "Ong Ong", along with "My Terracotta Heart" and "I Broadcast" were previously made available shortly before the album's release as promotional singles, and their official audios were uploaded to YouTube on 18, 21 and 23 April 2015, respectively. "Y'all Doomed", the bonus track on the Japanese edition, was released as a 7-inch single on 27 April 2015. "Ghost Ship", alongside a re-release of "I Broadcast", were later released as promotional singles on 23 October 2015.

Critical reception

At Metacritic, which assigns a normalised rating out of 100 to reviews from critics, the album received an average score of 81, indicating "universal acclaim", based on 35 reviews.

DIY magazine critic Stephen Ackroyd stated: "Their magic remains as strong as ever."
Helen Brown of The Telegraph stated that the album "turns out to be a triumphant comeback", and noted that "it retains the band's core identity while allowing ideas they'd fermented separately over the past decade to infuse their sound with mature and peculiar new flavour combinations."
Andy Gill of The Independent gave the album a positive review, calling it "a beautiful comeback".
Spin writer Andrew Unterberger gave the album an 8/10 rating and said, "Magic Whip is a fun album, nearly as much as any Gorillaz LPs," adding, "Magic Whip finds enough majesty and intrigue in the band's more meditative days to remain worthy company to any of the band's classic LPs."
Writing for the Rolling Stone magazine and giving the album four out of five stars, David Fricke called the album "A dark, seductive set that cements a legacy", stating that "Blur have returned with inspiration to spare."

Accolades

Track listing

Personnel
Blur
Damon Albarn – vocals, keyboards, synthesizers, iPad, acoustic guitar
Graham Coxon – electric guitar, backing vocals, co-lead vocals on "Lonesome Street", "Thought I Was a Spaceman", and "Y'all Doomed"
Alex James – bass guitar
Dave Rowntree – drums, percussion, backing vocals

Additional personnel
Stephen Street – production, programming, percussion, drum machine, "saxophones" (synthesizers) on "Ghost Ship"
James Dring – drum machine, drum programming
Demon Strings  – orchestration

Charts and certifications

Weekly charts

Year-end charts

Certifications

References

External links

The Magic Whip at YouTube (streamed copy where licensed)
 

2015 albums
Blur (band) albums
Parlophone albums
Warner Records albums
Albums produced by Stephen Street